Rolling Stone is an American monthly magazine that focuses on music, politics, and popular culture. It was founded in San Francisco, California, in 1967 by Jann Wenner, and the music critic Ralph J. Gleason. It was first known for its coverage of rock music and political reporting by Hunter S. Thompson. In the 1990s, the magazine broadened and shifted its focus to a younger readership interested in youth-oriented television shows, film actors, and popular music. It has since returned to its traditional mix of content, including music, entertainment, and politics.

The first magazine was released in 1967 and featured John Lennon on the cover and was published every two weeks. It is known for provocative photography and its cover photos, featuring musicians, politicians, athletes, and actors. In addition to its print version in the United States, it publishes content through Rollingstone.com and numerous international editions.

Penske Media Corporation is the current owner of Rolling Stone, having purchased 51 percent of the magazine in 2017 and the remaining 49 percent in 2020. Noah Shachtman became the editor-in-chief in 2021.

History

1967 to 1979: Founding and early history

Rolling Stone was founded in San Francisco in 1967 by Jann Wenner and Ralph J. Gleason.  To pay for the setup costs, Wenner borrowed $7,500 from his family and the parents of his soon-to-be wife, Jane Schindelheim. The first issue was released on November 9, 1967, and featured John Lennon in costume for the film How I Won the War on the cover. It was in newspaper format with a lead article on the Monterey Pop Festival. The cover price was 25¢ (equivalent to $ in 2016) and it was published bi-weekly.

In the first issue, Wenner explained that the title of the magazine referred to the 1950 blues song "Rollin' Stone", recorded by Muddy Waters, and Bob Dylan's 1965 hit single "Like a Rolling Stone":

Some authors have attributed the name solely to Dylan's hit single: "At [Ralph] Gleason's suggestion, Wenner named his magazine after a Bob Dylan song." Rolling Stone initially identified with and reported the hippie counterculture of the era. However, it distanced itself from the underground newspapers of the time, such as Berkeley Barb, embracing more traditional journalistic standards and avoiding the radical politics of the underground press. In the first edition, Wenner wrote that Rolling Stone "is not just about the music, but about the things and attitudes that music embraces". In a 2017 article celebrating the publication's 50th anniversary, Rolling Stones David Browne stated that the magazine's name was a nod to the Rolling Stones in an addition to "Rollin' Stone" and "Like a Rolling Stone".

The magazine's long-running slogan, "All the news that fits", was provided by early contributor, manager and sometime editor Susan Lydon. She lifted it from an April Fools issue of the Columbia Daily Spectator which posted "All the news that fits we print", a parody of The New York Times slogan, "All the News That's Fit to Print". The first appearance of the rubric was in 1969.

In the 1970s, Rolling Stone began to make a mark with its political coverage, with the likes of gonzo journalist Hunter S. Thompson writing for the magazine's political section. Thompson first published his most famous work, Fear and Loathing in Las Vegas, within the pages of Rolling Stone, where he remained a contributing editor until his death in 2005. In the 1970s, the magazine also helped launch the careers of many prominent authors, including Cameron Crowe, Lester Bangs, Joe Klein, Joe Eszterhas, Ben Fong-Torres, Patti Smith and P. J. O'Rourke. It was at this point that the magazine ran some of its most famous stories. The January 21, 1970, issue covered the Altamont Free Concert and the death of Meredith Hunter, which won a Specialized Journalism award at the National Magazine Awards in 1971. Later in 1970, Rolling Stone published a 30,000-word feature on Charles Manson by David Dalton and David Felton, including their interview of Manson when he was in the LA County Jail awaiting trial, which won Rolling Stone its first National Magazine Award. Four years later, they also covered the Patty Hearst abduction odyssey. One interviewer, speaking for many of his peers, said that he bought his first copy of the magazine upon initial arrival on his college campus, describing it as a "rite of passage".

In 1972, Wenner assigned Tom Wolfe to cover the launch of NASA's last Moon mission, Apollo 17. He published a four-part series in 1973 titled "Post-Orbital Remorse", about the depression that some astronauts experienced after having been in space. After the series, Wolfe began researching the whole of the space program, in what became a seven-year project from which he took time to write The Painted Word, a book on art, and to complete Mauve Gloves & Madmen, Clutter & Vine, a collection of shorter pieces and eventually The Right Stuff.

Rolling Stone recruited writers from smaller music magazines, including Paul Nelson from Sing Out!, who became record reviews editor from 1978 to 1983, and Dave Marsh from Creem.

In 1977, the magazine moved its headquarters from San Francisco to New York City. Editor Jann Wenner said San Francisco had become "a cultural backwater".

1980 to 1999: Change to entertainment magazine
Kurt Loder joined Rolling Stone in May 1979 and spent nine years there, including as editor. Timothy White joined as a writer from Crawdaddy and David Fricke from Musician. Tom Wolfe wrote to Wenner to propose an idea drawn from Charles Dickens and William Makepeace Thackeray: to serialize a novel. Wenner offered Wolfe around $200,000 to serialize his work. The frequent deadline pressure gave Wolfe the motivation he had sought, and from July 1984 to August 1985, he published a new installment in each biweekly issue of Rolling Stone. Later Wolfe was unhappy with his "very public first draft" and thoroughly revised his work, even changing his protagonist, Sherman McCoy, and published it as The Bonfire of the Vanities in 1987.

Rolling Stone was known for its musical coverage and for Thompson's political reporting and in 1985, they hired an advertising agency to refocus its image under the series "Perception/Reality" comparing Sixties symbols to those of the Eighties, which led to an increase in advertising revenue and pages. It also shifted to more of an entertainment magazine in the 1980s. It still had music as the main topic but began to increase its coverage of celebrities, films, and pop culture. It also began releasing its annual "Hot Issue". In the 1990s, the magazine changed its format to appeal to a younger readership interested in youth-oriented television shows, film actors, and popular music. This led to criticism that the magazine was emphasizing style over substance.

2000 to 2015: Expansion of readership

After years of declining readership, the magazine experienced a major resurgence of interest and relevance with the work of two young journalists in the late 2000s, Michael Hastings and Matt Taibbi. Rob Sheffield also joined from Spin. In 2005, Dana Leslie Fields, former publisher of Rolling Stone, who had worked at the magazine for 17 years, was an inaugural inductee into the Magazine Hall of Fame. In 2009, Taibbi unleashed an acclaimed series of scathing reports on the financial meltdown of the time. He famously described Goldman Sachs as "a great vampire squid".

Bigger headlines came at the end of June 2010. Rolling Stone caused a controversy in the White House by publishing in the July issue an article by journalist Michael Hastings entitled "The Runaway General", quoting criticism by General Stanley A. McChrystal, commander of the International Security Assistance Force and U.S. Forces-Afghanistan commander, about Vice President Joe Biden and other Administration members of the White House. McChrystal resigned from his position shortly after his statements went public. In 2010, Taibbi documented illegal and fraudulent actions by banks in the foreclosure courts, after traveling to Jacksonville, Florida and sitting in on hearings in the courtroom. His article, "Invasion of the Home Snatchers", also documented attempts by the judge to intimidate a homeowner fighting foreclosure and the attorney Taibbi accompanied into the court.

In January 2012, the magazine ran exclusive excerpts from Hastings' book just prior to publication. The book, The Operators: The Wild and Terrifying Inside Story of America's War in Afghanistan, provided a much more expansive look at McChrystal and the culture of senior American military and how they become embroiled in such wars. The book reached Amazon.com's bestseller list in the first 48 hours of release, and it received generally favorable reviews. Salon's Glenn Greenwald described it as "superb," "brave" and "eye-opening". In 2012, Taibbi, through his coverage of the Libor scandal, emerged as an expert on that topic, which led to media appearances outside Rolling Stone. On November 9, 2012, the magazine published its first Spanish-language section on Latino music and culture, in the issue dated November 22.

2016 to present: New ownership
In September 2016, Advertising Age reported that Wenner was in the process of selling a 49% stake of the magazine to a company from Singapore called BandLab Technologies. The new investor had no direct involvement in the editorial content of the magazine.

In September 2017, Wenner Media announced that the remaining 51% of Rolling Stone magazine was up for sale. In December 2017, Penske Media acquired the remaining stake from Wenner Media. It became a monthly magazine from the July 2018 issue. On January 31, 2019, Penske acquired BandLab's 49% stake in Rolling Stone, gaining full ownership of the magazine.

In January 2021, a Chinese edition of the magazine was launched, while in September 2021, Rolling Stone launched a dedicated UK edition in conjunction with Attitude magazine publisher Stream Publishing. The new British Rolling Stone launched into a marketplace which already featured titles like Mojo and BandLab Technologies's monthly music magazine Uncut. The first issue had a choice of three cover stars (including music acts Bastille and Sam Fender, as well as No Time To Die actor Lashana Lynch), with the magazine due to be a bi-monthly publication.

In February 2022, Rolling Stone announced the acquisition of Life Is Beautiful, saying, "Live events are an integral part of Rolling Stone's future."

Covers

Some artists have been featured on the cover many times, and some of these pictures went on to become iconic. The Beatles, for example, have appeared on the cover more than 30 times, either individually or as a band. The magazine is known for provocative photography and has featured musicians and celebrities on the cover throughout its history. Vanity Fair called the January 22, 1981, cover featuring John Lennon and Yoko Ono the "Greatest Rolling Stone Cover Ever".

The first ten issues featured, in order of appearance:
 John Lennon
 Tina Turner
 The Beatles
 Jimi Hendrix, Donovan and Otis Redding
 Jim Morrison
 Janis Joplin
 Jimi Hendrix
 Monterey Pop Festival
 John Lennon and Paul McCartney
 Eric Clapton

The magazine spent $1 million (equivalent to $ million in ) on the 3-D hologram cover of the special 1,000th issue (May 18, 2006) displaying multiple celebrities and other personalities.

Print format
The printed format has gone through several changes. The first publications, in 1967–72, were in folded tabloid newspaper format, with no staples, only black ink text, and a single color highlight that changed each edition. From 1973 onwards, editions were produced on a four-color press with a different newsprint paper size. In 1979, the bar code appeared. In 1980, it became a gloss-paper, large-format (10"×12") magazine. Editions switched to the standard 8"×11" magazine size starting with the issue dated October 30, 2008. Starting with the new monthly July 2018 issue, it returned to the previous 10"×12" large format.

Website
The publication's site at one time had an extensive message-board forum. By the late 1990s, this had developed into a thriving community, with many regular members and contributors worldwide. However, the site was also plagued with numerous Internet trolls, who vandalized the forum substantially. The magazine abruptly deleted the forum in May 2004, then began a new, much more limited message board community on their site in late 2005, only to remove it again in 2006. In March 2008, the website started a new message board section once again, then deleted it in April 2010.

Rolling Stone devotes one of its table of contents pages to promoting material currently appearing on its website, listing detailed links to the items.

On April 19, 2010, the website underwent a redesign and began featuring the complete archives of Rolling Stone. The archive was first launched under a for-pay model, but has since transitioned to a free-with-print-subscription model. In the spring of 2012, Rolling Stone launched a federated search feature, which searches both the website and the archive.

The website has become an interactive source of biographical information on music artists in addition to historical rankings from the magazine. Users can cross-reference lists and they are also provided with historical insights.  For example, one group that is listed on both Rolling Stone's 500 Greatest Albums of All Time and Rolling Stone's 500 Greatest Songs of All Time is Toots and the Maytals, with biographical details from Rolling Stone that explain how Toots and the Maytals coined the term "reggae" in their song "Do the Reggay". For biographical information on all artists, the website contains a directory listed alphabetically.

Glixel

In May 2016, Wenner Media announced plans to create a separate online publication dedicated to the coverage of video games and video game culture. Gus Wenner, Jann Wenner's son and head of digital for the publication at the time, told The New York Times that "gaming is today what rock 'n' roll was when Rolling Stone was founded". Glixel was originally hosted on Rolling Stones website and transitioned to its own domain by October 2016. Stories from Glixel are included on the Rolling Stone website, while writers for Rolling Stone were also able to contribute to Glixel. The site was headed by John Davison, and its offices were located in San Francisco. Rolling Stone closed down the offices in June 2017 and fired the entire staff, citing the difficulties of working with the remote site from their main New York office. Brian Crecente, founder of Kotaku and co-founder of Polygon, was hired as editorial director and runs the site from the main New York office. Following the sale of Rolling Stones assets to Penske Media Corporation, the Glixel content was merged into the routine publishing of Variety, with Crecente remaining as editorial director.

Restaurant
In December 2009, the Los Angeles Times reported that the owners of Rolling Stone magazine planned to open a Rolling Stone restaurant in the Hollywood & Highland Center in Hollywood in the spring of 2010. The expectation was that the restaurant could become the first of a national chain if it was successful. As of November 2010, the "soft opening" of the restaurant was planned for December 2010. In 2011, the restaurant was open for lunch and dinner as well as a full night club downstairs on the weekends. The restaurant closed in February 2013.

Reactions

One major criticism of Rolling Stone involves its generational bias toward the 1960s and 1970s. One critic referred to the Rolling Stone list of the "500 Greatest Songs" as an example of "unrepentant rockist fogeyism". In further response to this issue, rock critic Jim DeRogatis, a former Rolling Stone editor, published a thorough critique of the magazine's lists in a book called Kill Your Idols: A New Generation of Rock Writers Reconsiders the Classics, which featured differing opinions from many younger critics.

Rolling Stone magazine has been criticized for reconsidering many classic albums that it had previously dismissed, and for frequent use of the 3.5-star rating. For example, Led Zeppelin was largely written off by Rolling Stone magazine critics during the band's most active years in the 1970s, but by 2006, a cover story on the band honored them as "the Heaviest Band of All Time". A critic for Slate magazine described a conference at which 1984's The Rolling Stone Record Guide was scrutinized. As he described it, "The guide virtually ignored hip-hop and ruthlessly panned heavy metal, the two genres that within a few years would dominate the pop charts. In an auditorium packed with music journalists, you could detect more than a few anxious titters: How many of us will want our record reviews read back to us 20 years hence?"

The hiring of former FHM editor Ed Needham further enraged critics who alleged that Rolling Stone had lost its credibility.

The 2003 "Rolling Stone's 100 Greatest Guitarists of all Time" article, which named only two female musicians, resulted in Venus Zine answering with their own list, entitled "The Greatest Female Guitarists of All Time".

Conservative columnist Jonah Goldberg stated that Rolling Stone had "essentially become the house organ of the Democratic National Committee". Rolling Stone editor Jann Wenner has made all of his political donations to Democrats. Rolling Stone endorsed Democratic candidate Hillary Clinton in the run-up for the 2016 U.S. presidential election.

Rolling Stones film critic, Peter Travers, has been criticized for his high number of repetitively used blurbs.

In 2003, the article "Bug Chasers: The men who long to be HIV+" attracted commentators whose reactions ranged from agreement to challenge of the reported findings.

In 2005, the article "Deadly Immunity" by anti-vaccine activist Robert F. Kennedy, Jr. attracted criticism for quoting material out of context, and the Rolling Stone eventually amended the story with corrections in response to these and other criticisms.

Tsarnaev cover
The August 2013 Rolling Stone cover, featuring then-accused (later convicted) Boston Marathon bomber Dzhokhar Tsarnaev, drew widespread criticism that the magazine was "glamorizing terrorism" and that the cover was a "slap in the face to the great city of Boston". The online edition of the article was accompanied by a short editorial stating that the story "falls within the traditions of journalism and Rolling Stones long-standing commitment to serious and thoughtful coverage of the most important political and cultural issues of our day". The controversial cover photograph that was used by Rolling Stone had previously featured on the front page of The New York Times on May 5, 2013.

In response to the outcry, New England-based CVS Pharmacy and Tedeschi Food Shops banned their stores from carrying the issue. Also refusing to sell the issue were Walgreens; Rite-Aid and Kmart; Roche Bros. and Stop & Shop; H-E-B and Walmart; 7-Eleven; Hy-Vee, Rutter's Farm, and United Supermarkets; Cumberland Farms and Market Basket; and Shaw's.

Boston mayor Thomas Menino sent a letter to Rolling Stone publisher Jann Wenner, calling the cover "ill-conceived, at best ... [it] reaffirms a message that destruction gains fame for killers and their 'causes'." Menino also wrote, "To respond to you in anger is to feed into your obvious market strategy", and that Wenner could have written about the survivors or the people who came to help after the bombings instead. In conclusion he wrote, "The survivors of the Boston Marathon deserve Rolling Stone cover stories, though I no longer feel that Rolling Stone deserves them."

University of Virginia false rape story

In the issue dated November 19, 2014, the story "A Rape on Campus" was run about an alleged gang rape on the campus of the University of Virginia. Separate inquiries by Phi Kappa Psi, the fraternity accused by Rolling Stone of facilitating the alleged rape, and The Washington Post revealed major errors, omissions and discrepancies in the story. Reporter Sabrina Erdely's story was subject to intense media criticism. The Washington Post and Boston Herald issued calls for magazine staff involved in the report to be fired. Rolling Stone subsequently issued three apologies for the story.

On December 5, 2014, Rolling Stones managing editor, Will Dana, apologized for not fact-checking the story. Rolling Stone commissioned an outside investigation of the story and its problems by the dean of the Columbia School of Journalism. The report uncovered journalistic failure in the UVA story and institutional problems with reporting at Rolling Stone. Rolling Stone retracted the story on April 5, 2015. On April 6, 2015, following the investigation and retraction of the story, Phi Kappa Psi announced plans to pursue all available legal action against Rolling Stone, including claims of defamation.

On May 12, 2015, UVA associate dean Nicole Eramo, chief administrator for handling sexual assault issues at the school, filed a $7.5 million defamation lawsuit in Charlottesville Circuit Court against Rolling Stone and Erdely, claiming damage to her reputation and emotional distress.  Said the filing, "Rolling Stone and Erdely's highly defamatory and false statements about Dean Eramo were not the result of an innocent mistake.  They were the result of a wanton journalist who was more concerned with writing an article that fulfilled her preconceived narrative about the victimization of women on American college campuses, and a malicious publisher who was more concerned about selling magazines to boost the economic bottom line for its faltering magazine, than they were about discovering the truth or actual facts." On November 4, 2016, after 20 hours of deliberation, a jury consisting of eight women and two men found Rolling Stone, the magazine's publisher and Erdely liable for defaming Eramo, and awarded Eramo $3 million.

On July 29, 2015, three graduates of the fraternity Phi Kappa Psi filed a lawsuit against Rolling Stone, its publisher Wenner Media, and a journalist for defamation and infliction of emotional distress. The same day, and just months after the controversy began, The New York Times reported that managing editor Will Dana was departing the magazine with his last date recorded as August 7, 2015. On November 9, 2015, the Phi Kappa Psi Fraternity filed suit for $25 million for damages to its reputation caused by the magazine's publication of this story, "with reckless disregard for the truth". Rolling Stone paid the fraternity $1.65 million to settle the suit out of court.

False ivermectin story 
In September 2021, Rolling Stone picked up a story published by Oklahoma news outlet KFOR which claimed that so many people had been hospitalized due to ivermectin overdoses in Oklahoma that there was no room in intensive care units for other patients, including those with gunshot wounds. However, an Oklahoma hospital said in a statement that there was no shortage of beds due to ivermectin overdoses, and the doctor who had been interviewed by KFOR had not said that ivermectin cases were crowding out other patients, but the initial story and subsequent coverage had linked separate comments about ivermectin overdoses and scarce beds. CNN fact-checker Daniel Dale stated that Rolling Stone had "[run] an adaptation of the KFOR story without appearing to do sufficient research to make sure the local report was sound". Rolling Stone subsequently added an editor's note which retracted the core point of its story.

Kyle Smith of National Review wrote that Rolling Stone's correction "is so humiliating, it's a wonder the place doesn't shut its doors immediately, liquidate all assets, and deny that it ever existed." Robby Soave of Reason wrote that the correct story "was something Rolling Stone could have figured out on its own had the magazine bothered to contact any hospitals in Oklahoma, but alas." Alex Shephard of The New Republic wrote: "For mainstream and, particularly, liberal media this should be a stark reminder of the value of due diligence and checking sources. At the very least, make a phone call."

In popular culture
George Harrison's 1975 song "This Guitar (Can't Keep from Crying)", a lyrical sequel to his Beatles track "While My Guitar Gently Weeps" (1968), references the magazine in its second verse: "Learned to get up when I fall / Can even climb Rolling Stone walls". The song was written in response to some highly unfavorable reviews from Rolling Stone and other publications for Harrison's 1974 North American tour and the Dark Horse album.

The 2000 film Almost Famous centers on a teenage journalist writing for the magazine in the early 1970s while covering the fictional band Stillwater. The film was directed by Cameron Crowe and based on his own experiences as a young journalist for the magazine in the same time period.

"The Cover of Rolling Stone" is a song written by Shel Silverstein and first recorded by American rock group Dr. Hook & the Medicine Show. The song satirizes success in the music business; the song's narrator laments that his band, despite having the superficial attributes of a successful rock star (including drug usage, "teenage groupies, who'll do anything we say", and a frenetic guitar solo), has been unable to "get their pictures on the cover of the Rolling Stone".

The title track of Pink Floyd's album The Final Cut features the line, "Would you sell your story to Rolling Stone?"

In Stephen King's novel Firestarter, the protagonists decide to tell their story to Rolling Stone.

In Joni Mitchell's song "California", the magazine is referenced in the line, "Reading Rolling Stone reading Vogue".

In May 2022, an off-Broadway play adapted from the "A Rape on Campus" article controversy and resulting legal battles titled Retraction premiered in New York City at Theatre Four at Theatre Row.

International editions
Publisher Steve DeLuca said the international editions typically include 50 to 80 percent of the American version of the magazine, translated in their own languages, and supplemented with local content. Since PMC took over full ownership of the title, Rolling Stone is published in 15 territories around the world, with the introduction of Rolling Stone UK in September 2021 the latest to be launched.
  – Published by La Nación since April 1998. This edition also circulates in Bolivia, Paraguay and Uruguay. In 2007 it celebrated its ninth year by publishing Rolling Stone Argentinas The 100 Greatest Albums of National Rock. 
 Australia – Rolling Stone Australia began as a supplement in 1969 in Revolution magazine. It became a full title in 1971 published by Phillip Frazer. It was published by Silvertongues from 1974 to 1987 and by nextmedia Pty Ltd, Sydney until 2008. Notable editors and contributors include Phillip Frazer, Alistair Jones, Paul and Jane Gardiner, Toby Creswell, Clinton Walker and Kathy Bail. It was the longest running international edition but closed in January 2018. Rolling Stone Australia relaunched in 2020.
 Brazil – Published in Brazil from October 2006 to May 2018 by Spring Comunicações, and currently owned by Grupo Perfil. In 1972, a pirated Brazilian edition of Rolling Stone was created; this pirated edition was not officially recognized by the American publication.
 Bulgaria – Published in Bulgaria from November 2009 to August 2011 by Sivir Publications.
 Chile – Published from May 2003 to December 2005 by Edu Comunicaciones, and from January 2006 to December 2011 by El Mercurio.
 China – The original Rolling Stone for mainland China was published by the One Media Group of Hong Kong. The magazine was in Chinese with translated articles and local content. It halted publication after one year. From January 2021, a new Chinese-language Rolling Stone magazine started to be published in China.
 Colombia – Edited in Bogotá for Colombia, Ecuador, Perú, Panama and Venezuela, since 1991.
 Croatia – Published from 2013 to 2015 by S3 Mediji. This edition also circulates in Bosnia and Herzegovina, North Macedonia, Montenegro, Serbia and Slovenia.
 France – Went through multiple breaks and phases published by different companies. Initially launched in 1988.
 Germany – Published since 1994 by Axel Springer AG.
 India – Launched in March 2008 by MW.Com, publisher of Man's World.
 Indonesia – Published from June 2005 to January 2018 by PT a&e Media.
 Italy – Published since 1980. After ceasing publication in 1982, it was relaunched in November 2003, first by IXO Publishing, and then by Editrice Quadratum until April 2014. The magazine is currently published by Luciano Bernardini de Pace Editore. It ceased print edition in 2019, moving online.
 Japan – Launched in March 2007 by International Luxury Media. Published by  since 2011.
 Korea – Launched in 2020, under a license agreement with Penske Media Corporation.
 Mexico – Published by PRISA from November 2002 to May 2009. Published from June 2009 by Editorial Televisa (subsidiary of Televisa) under license.
 Middle East – Published in Dubai by HGW Media since November 2010.
 Russia – Published since 2004 by Motor Media.
 South Africa – Published since November 2011 by 3i Publishing.
 Spain – Published by PROGRESA (subsidiary of PRISA) in Madrid from 1999 to 2015.
 Turkey – Published since June 2006 by GD Gazete Dergi.
 United Kingdom – Published under the title Friends of Rolling Stone, later shortened to Friends and eventually Frendz, from 1969 to 1972. In September 2021, issue 001 of the bi-monthly 180-page British edition, priced at £6.95, was published under the title Rolling Stone UK, where it joined the American edition of Rolling Stone on the shelves of British newsagents.

See also
 The Rolling Stone Interview
 Counterculture of the 1960s
 Rolling Stone charts
 List of underground newspapers of the 1960s counterculture

References

Sources
 
 
  The Only Girl (book)

Further reading

External links

 
 

 
1967 establishments in California
Biweekly magazines published in the United States
Counterculture of the 1960s
Liberalism in the United States
Magazines established in 1967
Magazines published in Milan
Magazines published in New York City
Magazines published in San Francisco
Magazines published in Istanbul
Monthly magazines published in the United States
Music magazines published in France
Music magazines published in Germany
Music magazines published in India
Music magazines published in Italy
Music magazines published in Russia
Music magazines published in the United Kingdom
Music magazines published in the United States
Penske Media Corporation
Political magazines published in the United States
PRISA
Progressivism in the United States